The Nordic Artistic Gymnastics Championships is an artistic gymnastics competition for both male and female gymnasts from countries and dependencies from the Nordics.

Participating nations

Editions

References 

Artistic gymnastics competitions
Inter-Nordic sports competitions